Tricholoma huronense is a mushroom of the agaric genus Tricholoma. It was first described in 1942 by American mycologist Alexander H. Smith based on collections made in Michigan.

References

External links
 

Fungi described in 1942
Fungi of North America
huronense